The Åland official football team is the official football team for Åland, Finland, and is controlled by Ålands Fotbollförbund. They are not affiliated with FIFA or UEFA.

The team mainly competes in the Island Games. Åland hosted the games in 1991 and 2009. The team won a silver medal in 2009 and bronze medal in 1989 and 1993. They also reached fourth place in 1991 and 2011.

Åland also has a successful club football side, IFK Mariehamn, which plays in the Finnish premier league (Veikkausliiga) and won the league in 2016.

Tournament records

Selected internationals opponents

Kit manufacturers

Managers

 Johnny Söderdahl (1989)
 Robert Mann Henrik Bostrom Mats Danielsson (1995)
 Bernt Danielsson Per-Åke Eriksson (2005)
 Bengt Johnsson Peter Lundberg Tommy Lundberg (2007)
 Peter Lundberg Daniel Norrmén (2009)
 Per-Åke Eriksson Thomas Nordström (2011)
 Johan Carlssons Steve Beeks (2015)
 Alexandre Semenov Stefan Mattsson (2017–present)

References

External links
Ålands Fotbollförbund 
National-Football-Teams.com
Island Games Website

National football team
European national and official selection-teams not affiliated to FIFA